The 2022 Sakhir FIA Formula 3 round was a motor racing event held on 19 and 20 March 2022 at the Bahrain International Circuit, Sakhir, Bahrain. It was the opening round of the 2022 FIA Formula 3 Championship, and was held in support of the 2022 Bahrain Grand Prix.

Classification

Qualifying 
The Qualifying session took place on 18 March 2022, with F3 debutant Franco Colapinto scoring his and his team's (Van Amersfoort Racing) first pole-position in the series, while Roman Staněk achieved his best ever qualifying result with second.

 Notes

  – Kush Maini qualified in third place, but was forced to start from the pitlane in both races due to missing the weighbridge during the first half of qualifying.
  – Ayrton Simmons received a three-place penalty for impeding Alexander Smolyar during qualifying. As he had originally qualified in 29th place, he started from last on the grid.

Sprint Race 
Following a battle for the lead between polesitter Zak O'Sullivan and Oliver Bearman the latter was able to build a gap on his competitors. Bearman would cross the line in first place, but was given a time penalty for extending the track on multiple occasions, which promoted fellow rookie Isack Hadjar to the top step of the podium. Bearman ended up second and Alexander Smolyar finished third.

Notes

  – Oliver Bearman and László Tóth originally finished the race first and 21st, but were each given a five-second penalty for track limit infringements.
  – Hunter Yeany received a ten-second time penalty for exceeding the track limits on multiple occasions, demoting him from 18th to 23rd.

Feature Race 

Notes

  - Hunter Yeany originally finished in 14th place, but was demoted to 21st by virtue of a five-second penalty for causing a collision with Niko Kari.
  - Alexander Smolyar originally finished in 8th place, but was given a total penalty of 20 seconds due to both exceeding track limits and causing a collision with Isack Hadjar respectively, demoting him to 23rd.
  - Enzo Trulli received a ten-second time penalty for causing a collision with Francesco Pizzi.

Standings after the event 

Drivers' Championship standings

Teams' Championship standings

 Note: Only the top five positions are included for both sets of standings.

See also 
 2022 Bahrain Grand Prix
 2022 Sakhir Formula 2 round

Notes

References

External links 

 Official website

|- style="text-align:center"
|width="35%"|Previous race:
|width="30%"|FIA Formula 3 Championship2022 season
|width="40%"|Next race:

Sakhir
Sakhir Formula 3
Sakhir Formula 3